Tlohang Sekhamane is a politician from Lesotho who is serving as the Speaker of the National Assembly and a former Minister of Foreign Affairs and International Relations.

Personal life 
He was born in 30 May 1955 in Mokhotlong District.

References 

Living people
Lesotho politicians
1955 births
People from Mokhotlong District
Foreign Ministers of Lesotho

Speakers of the National Assembly (Lesotho)